The Big Tease is a 1999 American comedy film starring Craig Ferguson, directed by Kevin Allen, and written by Ferguson and Sacha Gervasi.

Plot 
Ferguson plays Crawford Mackenzie, a Scottish hairdresser who, while being filmed as part of a fly-on-the-wall BBC documentary, is invited to the World Hairdresser International Federation annual contest. The documentary team (with Chris Langham playing the interviewer) follows Crawford to L.A., where he discovers that his invitation is to be a member of the audience rather than a competitor. He eventually weasels his way into the contest and produces the greatest creation of his career.

Cast
 Craig Ferguson as Crawford Mackenzie
 Frances Fisher as Candace "Candy" Harper
 Mary McCormack as Monique Geingold
 Chris Langham as Martin Samuels, BBC Interviewer
 David Rasche as Stig Ludwigssen
 Donal Logue as Eamonn McGarvey
 Larry Miller as Dunstan Cactus
 Isabella Aitken as Mrs. Beasie Mackenzie
 Kevin Allen as Gareth Trundle
 Angela McCluskey as Senga Magoogan
 Francine York as Elegant Woman
 Nina Siemaszko as Betty Fuego
 Charles Napier as Sen. Warren Crockett
 Melissa Rivers as Dianne Abbott (credited as Melissa Rosenberg)
 David Hasselhoff as himself
 Drew Carey as himself
 Cathy Lee Crosby as herself

Production 
It was filmed on location in Glasgow and Los Angeles. The inspiration for this film came from Craig Ferguson's desire to make a cheerful film celebrating Scottishness, as opposed to the epic nature of films like Braveheart and Rob Roy, or the downbeat quality of Trainspotting and Shallow Grave.
The script was snapped up by Warner Brothers after a five-day bidding war.
Warner Brothers was the only studio prepared to immediately greenlight the film. A fast turnaround was required so it could be shot while Ferguson was on hiatus from The Drew Carey Show.

The Big Tease was not the only hairdressing film in development at the time; The Big Tease was released first in 1999, causing Blow Dry to be delayed until 2001.

Casting 
It took casting director Kris Nicolau about five weeks to fill all seventy roles in the film.
Frances Fisher was originally to read for the part of Monique, a role which went to Mary McCormack. Instead she opted to play Candy, the publicist.

Craig Ferguson attended a hairdressing institute to learn all about the art of hairdressing. The hairpieces used in the final Platinum Scissors competition are made from real human hair. Acrylic (which is normally used in wigs) doesn't photograph well and ends up looking like plastic. Each hairpiece weighed about

References

External links 
 
 
 
 

1999 films
1990s screwball comedy films
American screwball comedy films
American mockumentary films
Films directed by Kevin Allen
Films with screenplays by Craig Ferguson
1999 comedy films
1990s English-language films
1990s American films